Eric W. Ferguson (31 December 1930 – 23 September 2006) was a Progressive Conservative party member of the House of Commons of Canada. He was born in Tangier, Nova Scotia and became a police officer and consultant by career.

He represented the Saint John electoral district since winning that seat in the 1979 federal election. After serving in the 31st Canadian Parliament, Ferguson was defeated in the 1980 election by Mike Landers of the Liberal party.

External links
 

1930 births
2006 deaths
Members of the House of Commons of Canada from New Brunswick
Progressive Conservative Party of Canada MPs